This is a list of villages and settlements in Delta State, Nigeria arranged  by Local Government Area (L.G.A) and district/area (with postal codes also given).

By postal code
Below is a list of polling units, that includes villages and schools, arranged  by postal code.

By electoral ward
Below is a list of polling units, including villages and schools, organised by electoral ward.

References

Delta